Allium macropetalum, the desert onion, is a species of wild onion native to the desert regions of southwestern United States and northwestern Mexico. It is known from desert plains and hills in Sonora, Arizona, Utah, Colorado, New Mexico, and Texas, at elevations up to 2500 m.

Allium macropetalum forms egg-shaped bulbs up to 2.5 cm long. Flowers are bell-shaped, pink to purple, up to 12 mm across, with yellow or purple anthers.

References

External links
 

macropetalum
Onions
Plants described in 1904
Flora of the Southwestern United States
Flora of Sonora